Eloy Palacios Cabello, (June 25, 1847 - December 12, 1919), was a Venezuelan artist, sculptor. 

He was born in Maturín, Monagas, Venezuela.  He studied in Germany and returned to Venezuela in 1873.  After Antonio Guzmán Blanco was offended by a portrait that Palacios made of him, Palacios was exiled in Trinidad, Costa Rica and Germany.  Eloy Palacios died in Havana, Cuba on December 12, 1919. The Escuela Técnica de Artes Plásticas Eloy Palacios was named in his honor.

Important works
Statue of José María Vargas, Vargas Hospital, Caracas.
Monument to José Félix Ribas, La Victoria.
Statue of Simón Bolívar, Plaza Bolívar, Maracaibo (copia de una realizada previamente para la ciudad de Cartagena de Indias, en Colombia)
Statue of José Antonio Páez, Plaza Páez, Caracas. 
Monument to La India, sector Paraiso, Caracas.
Monumento to Jesús Jiménez Zamora (Cartago, Costa Rica) Guillermo Brenes Tencio
Statue to Luisa Otoya de Amerling (San José, Cementerio General, Costa Rica)

People from Maturín
Venezuelan sculptors
1847 births
1919 deaths
20th-century sculptors
19th-century sculptors